The 1918 South Carolina gubernatorial election was held on November 5, 1918, to select the governor of the state of South Carolina. Robert Archer Cooper emerged from the crowded Democratic primary and ran unopposed in the one-party state's general election to become the 93rd governor of South Carolina.

Democratic primary
The South Carolina Democratic Party held their primary for governor on August 27 and progressive reformer Robert Archer Cooper emerged as the winner in a crowded field. He garnered more than 50 percent of the vote in the primary election and was able to avoid a runoff election.

General election
The general election was held on November 5, 1918, and Robert Archer Cooper was elected the next governor of South Carolina without opposition. Being a non-presidential election and few contested races, turnout was much less than the previous gubernatorial election.

 

|-
| 
| colspan=5 |Democratic hold
|-

See also
Governor of South Carolina
List of governors of South Carolina
South Carolina gubernatorial elections

References

"Report of the Secretary of State to the General Assembly of South Carolina.  Part II." Reports of State Officers Boards and Committees to the General Assembly of the State of South Carolina. Volume II. Columbia, South Carolina: 1919, p. 34.

External links
SCIway Biography of Robert Archer Cooper

1918 United States gubernatorial elections
1918
Gubernatorial
November 1918 events